The PRL Museum is a museum in Kraków, Poland devoted to documenting the forty-year history of the communist People's Republic of Poland (PRL).  It occupies the building of the old Kino Światowid ("Svetovid Cinema"), a formerly state-owned cinema in the Nowa Huta district of Kraków.

The museum was established in 2008 as a division of the Warsaw Museum of Polish History. However, on November 7, 2012, the city council of Kraków decided to establish an independent museum in its place run by the city itself. Waiting for the renovation, the museum runs exhibitions in Kino Światowid ("Svetovid Cinema") and, since recently, offers guided tours through nuclear bunkers of Nowa Huta.

Notes and references

Museum Home page

Museums in Kraków
Museums established in 2008
History museums in Poland